River of Gold may refer to:
 River of Gold (1998 film), a Portuguese drama film
 River of Gold (1971 film), an American TV film